Arbon is an unincorporated community in Power County, Idaho, United States. Arbon has a post office with ZIP code 83212.

The first settlement at Arbon was made in 1893. The community has the name of George Arbon, a pioneer settler.

Arbon's population was 100 in 1909, and 10 in 1960.

Climate 

According to the Köppen Climate Classification system, Arbon has a semi-arid climate, abbreviated "BSk" on climate maps.

References 

Unincorporated communities in Power County, Idaho
Unincorporated communities in Idaho
1893 establishments in Idaho